Gimale Essacu (born 4 July 1997) is a Papua New Guinean footballer who last played as a midfielder for Western Illinois Leathernecks.

Career

Essacu started his career with Australian side Canberra City. In 2017, he joined Otero Rattlers in the United States.In 2018, Essacu signed for Australian club West Canberra Wanderers. After that, he joined Western Illinois Leathernecks in the United States.

References

1997 births
Association football midfielders
Canberra City FC players
Expatriate soccer players in Australia
Expatriate soccer players in the United States
Living people
Papua New Guinean expatriate footballers
Papua New Guinean expatriate sportspeople in Australia
Papua New Guinean expatriate sportspeople in the United States
Papua New Guinean footballers
Western Illinois Leathernecks men's soccer players
Western Illinois University alumni